Kvitvatnet is a lake that lies in the municipality of Sørfold in Nordland county, Norway. The lake lies on the north side of the Blåmannsisen glacier, just south of the Rago National Park, and just west of the border with Sweden.

See also
 List of lakes in Norway
 Geography of Norway

References

Sørfold
Lakes of Nordland